Inverlochy may refer to:

 Inverlochy, Highland
 Inverlochy Castle
 Battle of Inverlochy (1431)
 Battle of Inverlochy (1645)